The Haselbach is a river of Saxony, Germany. It is a right tributary of the Pulsnitz, which it joins near Reichenau.

See also
List of rivers of Saxony

Rivers of Saxony
Rivers of Germany